Georgy Mihailovich Kondratiev (1887–1958) Russian physicist, specialist in thermal measurements.

Biography

Graduated from Saint Petersburg State University in 1912 and from Saint Petersburg State Polytechnic University in 1923. In 1917-1918 attended High Course of Pedagogic.

From 1924 to 1943 was a head of a laboratory and a head of a department in the Research Institute of Meteorology in Leningrad. In 1932 became chairman of Thermal Insulation Committee and a member of The Central board of Scientific and Technical Society of Energetic Industry Workers.

From the year 1935 took significant part in scientific life of many institutes, like Leningrad Region State Institute for Thermal Machine Engineering, Institute of Refractory Materials, etc. In 1936 became professor of Leningrad Institute for Cooling Industry.

In 1940 Georgy Kondratiev received Doctor degree.

In Leningrad Institute for Precise Mechanics and Optics Georgy Kondratiev occupied several positions: head of the Heat-control Department (1938-1942); head of the Physics Department (1949-1950); head of the Thermal Physics Department (1948); and head of the Thermal and Measurement Devices Department (1956-1958). From 1948-1952 was elected Dean of Department of Engineering and Physics department.

Georgy Condratiev founded scientific school of heat and mass exchange in instrumentation area. Also, Georgy Condratiev developed a few devices.

in 1949 he was awarded USSR State Prize for design of devices that were able to measure material heat properties in a short time. In 1957 he was awarded degree of Honoured master of sciences and engineering.

He also was awarded Order of Lenin, Order of the Red Star, Medal "For the Defence of Stalingrad" and by Medal "For Valiant Labour in the Great Patriotic War 1941–1945".

References

External links
 Photo
 Photo
 The Best scientists of ITMO
 Georgy Mihailovich Kondratiev at ITMO Virtual Museum

1887 births
1958 deaths
Optical physicists
Russian university and college faculty deans
Scientists from Saint Petersburg
Academic staff of ITMO University